Mojave Firebrand is a 1944 American Western film directed by Spencer Gordon Bennet and written by Norman S. Hall. The film stars Wild Bill Elliott, George "Gabby" Hayes, Anne Jeffreys, LeRoy Mason, Jack Ingram and Harry McKim. The film was released on March 19, 1944, by Republic Pictures.

Plot

Gabby Whittaker (George "Gabby" Hayes) is a God fearing man who strikes it rich when Elijah, his mule, uncovers a silver claim.  Whittaker goes about setting up a school and bringing in a teacher, Abigail Holmes (Anne Jeffries), for  the town of Epitaph.  Tracy Dalton, aka Turkey Dameron (LeRoy Mason) have moved in to Epitaph and have taken with the help of shady Sheriff Barker (Forrest Taylor) and Mayor Frisbie (Hal Price.)   When good-guy Wild Bill Elliott comes across the Dalton gang giving 'ole Gabby a hard time, he comes to the rescue.  Elliott then decides to help clean up the town and remove the corrupt henchmen in Epitaph.

Cast  
Wild Bill Elliott as Wild Bill Elliott
George "Gabby" Hayes as Gabby Hayes
Anne Jeffreys as Gail Holmes
LeRoy Mason as Tracy Dalton, aka Turkey Dameron
Jack Ingram as Henchman Matt Ganton
Harry McKim as Johnny Taylor
Karl Hackett as Miner Luke Reed
Forrest Taylor as Sheriff Barker
Hal Price as Mayor Prisbie
Marshall Reed as Henchman Nate Bigelow
Kenne Duncan as Henchman
Bud Geary as Henchman Red Collins
Jack Kirk as Miner Jeff Butler

References

External links
 

1944 films
1940s English-language films
American Western (genre) films
1944 Western (genre) films
Republic Pictures films
Films directed by Spencer Gordon Bennet
American black-and-white films
1940s American films